= Lynn John Arnold =

American lawyer

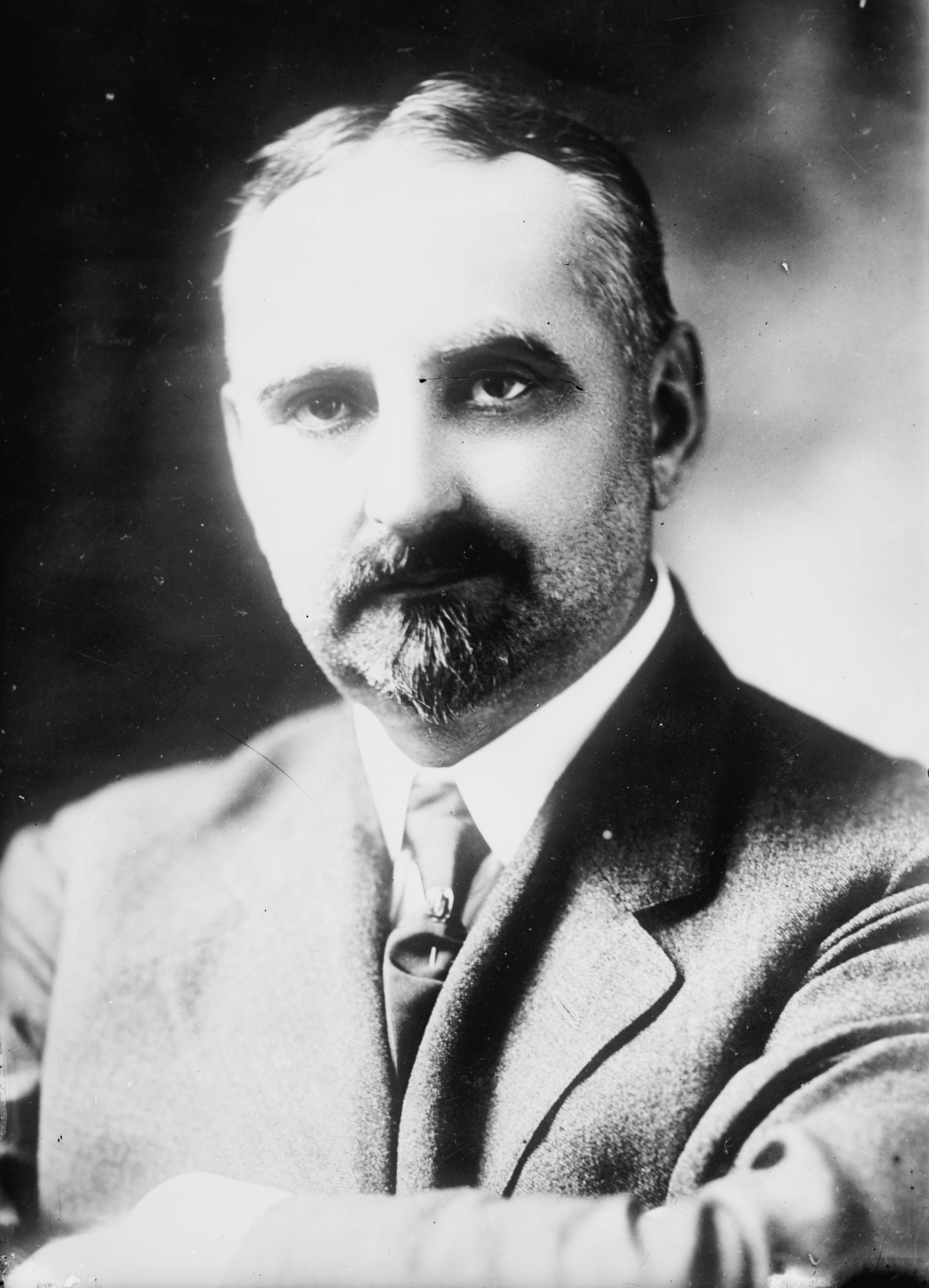

Lynn John Arnold (1864–1920) was an American bank president, publisher, lawyer, and a judge. In 1911 he was the publisher of the Knickerbocker Press.
